The speaker of the Lok Sabha is the presiding officer and the highest  official of the Lok Sabha, the lower house of the Parliament of India. The speaker is elected generally in the first meeting of the Lok Sabha following general elections. Serving for a term of five years, the speaker is chosen from sitting members of the Lok Sabha.

Election of the speaker 
Newly elected Members of Parliament from the Lok Sabha elect the Speaker among themselves. The Speaker should be someone who understands how the Lok Sabha functions and he/she should be someone accepted among the ruling and opposition parties.

MPs propose a name to the Pro tem speaker. These names are notified to the President of India. The President through their aide Secretary-General notifies the election date. If only one name is proposed, the Speaker is elected without any formal vote. However, if more than one nomination is received, a division (vote) is called. MPs vote for their candidate on such a date notified by President. The successful candidate is elected as Speaker of the Lok Sabha until the next general election.Till now election of all lok sabha speakers has been unanimous

Powers and functions of the speaker

The Speaker of the Lok Sabha conducts the business in house, and decides whether a bill is a money bill or not. They maintain discipline and decorum in the house and can punish a member for unruly behavior with respect to law after suspending them. They also permit the moving of various kinds of motions and resolutions such as a motion of no confidence, motion of adjournment, motion of censure and calling attention notice as per the rules. The Speaker decides on the agenda to be taken up for discussion during the meeting. The date of election of the Speaker is fixed by the President. Further, all comments and speeches made by members of the House are addressed to the Speaker. The Speaker also presides over the joint sitting of both houses of the Parliament of India. The counterpart of the Speaker in the Rajya Sabha (Council of the States) is its Chairperson; the Vice-President of India is the ex-officio chairperson of the Rajya Sabha. On the order of precedence, the Speaker of Lok Sabha ranks sixth, along with the Chief Justice of India. The Speaker is answerable to the House. Both the Speaker and Deputy Speaker may be removed by a resolution passed by the majority of the members. Lok Sabha Speaker can be elected by President on a nomination basis.

All bills passed requires the speaker's signature to go to the Rajya Sabha for its consideration. The Speaker also has a casting vote in the event of a tie. It is customary for the Presiding Officer to exercise the casting vote in such a manner as to maintain the status quo.

Removal of the speaker
Speaker can be removed by the Lok Sabha by a resolution passed by effective majority of the house as per Constitution of India[Articles 94].

The Speaker is also removed on being disqualified for being Lok Sabha member under sections 7 and 8 of Representation of the People Act, 1951. This would arise out of speaker's wrong certification of a bill as money bill inconsistent with the definition given in Articles 110 of the constitution. When courts uphold the unconstitutional act of the speaker for wrong certification of a bill as money bill, it amounts to disrespecting the constitution deserving conviction under Prevention of Insults to National Honour Act, 1971 which is applicable for disqualification of speaker's Lok Sabha membership under section 8K of Representation of the People Act, 1951. However, the omissions in the procedure committed by the speaker in the Lok Sabha can not be challenged in court of law per Article 122.

Pro tem speaker
After a general election and formation of a new government, a list of senior Lok Sabha members prepared by the Legislative Section is submitted to the Minister of Parliamentary Affairs, who selects a pro tem speaker. The appointment has to be approved by the President.

The first meeting after the election when the Speaker and the Deputy Speaker are selected by members of the Parliament is held under the pro tem Speaker. In absence of the Speaker, the Deputy Speaker acts as Speaker and in the absence of both a committee of six members selected by the Speaker will act as Speaker according to their seniority.

Eligiblilty for Speaker of the Lok Sabha include:

 Being a citizen of India;
 Not be less than 25 years of age;
 Not holding any office of profit under the Government of India, or a state government; and
 Not being a Criminal Offender.

List of speakers

See also
Vice President of India (Chairperson of the Rajya Sabha)
Deputy Speaker of the Lok Sabha
Deputy Chairperson of the Rajya Sabha
Leader of the House in Lok Sabha
Leader of the Opposition in Lok Sabha
Leader of the House in Rajya Sabha
Leader of the Opposition in Rajya Sabha
Secretary General of the Lok Sabha

References

External links
 

Lists of legislative speakers in India

Lists of political office-holders in India
Lists of members of the Lok Sabha